Big Birch Lake is a  lake near the towns of Grey Eagle, Minnesota and St. Rosa, Minnesota. It is popular for watersports and fishing.

Lakes of Minnesota
Lakes of Stearns County, Minnesota
Lakes of Todd County, Minnesota